The 1923 Boston University football team was an American football team that represented Boston University as an independent during the 1923 college football season. In its third season under head coach Charles Whelan, the team compiled a 1–6 record, was shut out in five of seven games, and was outscored by a total of 181 to 21.

Schedule

References

Boston University
Boston University Terriers football seasons
Boston University football